The Jonway A380 is a compact crossover SUV (sport utility vehicle) produced by the Chinese automobile manufacturer Jonway Automobile priced at 67,900 yuan.

Styling controversy

The Styling of the Jonway A380 has always been controversial as the exterior styling of the Jonway A380 was apparently reverse-engineered from the second generation Toyota RAV4 (XA20) without a license. The Jonway A380 proposed in both three-door short wheelbase and five-door long wheelbase are all considered copies of the Toyota crossover. The car immediately gets high media exposure because of the similarity with the original Japanese model in every detail.

Specifications

2013 facelift

In 2012 Jonway Automobile signed an agreement with Maggiora the coachbuilder to conduct a facelift for the Jonway UFO A380. The model exhibited at the concept car stadium only went into production at the end of 2013.

Jonway Falcon
In 2013 Jonway Automobile presented a second crossover named Jonway Falcon.  The Jonway Falcon was based on the mechanics and body of the Jonway A380 but with a restyled exterior and interior design.

References

External links 

 Jonway Auto global site

2010s cars
All-wheel-drive vehicles
Cars introduced in 2005
Compact sport utility vehicles
Crossover sport utility vehicles
Front-wheel-drive vehicles
Mini sport utility vehicles
Vehicles with CVT transmission